American rapper Vanilla Ice has released six studio albums, two compilation albums, one live album, one remix album, and 25 singles. His debut album, To the Extreme, was the fastest-selling hip hop album of all time. His single "Ice Ice Baby" was the first hip hop single to top the Billboard charts, and has been credited with helping to diversify hip hop by introducing it to a mainstream white audience. Soundtrack appearances and a live album, Extremely Live continued the success but a second mainstream studio album Mind Blowin' featured an image change which saw a massive drop in popularity for Ice. Further albums, including Hard to Swallow, Bi-Polar and Platinum Underground, featured a less mainstream rock-oriented sound, and did not chart.

In 2008, a remix album titled Vanilla Ice Is Back! was released via Cleopatra Records. The album failed to chart; however, "Ice Ice Baby" was re-released as a single in the United Kingdom, where it reached number 146 on the UK Singles Chart. A new studio album, W.T.F. (Wisdom, Tenacity And Focus), was officially released on August 30, 2011, after being delayed for two years.

Albums

Studio albums

Live albums

Compilation albums

Remix albums

Singles

As lead artist

As featured artist

Guest appearances

Unreleased and demos

Soundtrack appearances

Music videos

As lead artist

As featured artist

References

Discographies of American artists
Hip hop discographies
Discography